"Where Will I Be Now" is a pop single by the Bay City Rollers.  It was the first of three singles released from their 1978 album Strangers in the Wind.  The tune, written by British songwriter Chris East and featuring a lead vocal by Les McKeown, is an uptempo song with a heavily-orchestrated disco-style arrangement.  It was released as a 7" vinyl single in Japan, Germany, and the United States.

"Where Will I Be Now" became a chart hit in Germany, reaching number 48.  The song was the most  successful single from the album, and it marked the Rollers' final appearance on any national music chart.

Track listing
1. "Where Will I Be Now" - 3:29
2. "If You Were My Woman" - 3:13

Credits
 Producer - Harry Maslin
 Written By - Chris East

Chart performance
 Japan: (did not chart)
 Germany: #48
 USA: (did not chart)

References

External links
Lyrics of this song
 

Bay City Rollers songs
1978 singles
1978 songs
Arista Records singles